The 2017–18 TCU Horned Frogs men's basketball team represented Texas Christian University in the 2017–18 NCAA Division I men's basketball season, led by head coach Jamie Dixon in his second season at TCU. The Horned Frogs competed as members of the Big 12 Conference and played their home games at Schollmaier Arena in Fort Worth, Texas. They finished the season 21–12, 9–9 in Big 12 play to finish in fifth place. They lost in the quarterfinals of the Big 12 tournament to Kansas State. They received an at-large bid to the NCAA tournament, their first appearance in 20 years. Seeded No. 6 in the Midwest region, TCU lost in the first round to Syracuse.

Previous season
In 2016, the Horned Frogs introduced Jamie Dixon, a former TCU letterman, as the new head men's basketball coach. In his first season after leaving Pitt for his alma mater, Dixon led the Frogs to a 24–15, 6–12 Big 12 record. The Frogs' 6–12 record and eighth-place finish was their best league mark since joining the Big 12 in 2012. In the postseason, TCU defeated Oklahoma and No. 1 Kansas in the Big 12 tournament before losing in their first-ever Big 12 semifinal berth to Iowa State. They received an invitation to the National Invitation Tournament where they defeated Fresno State, Iowa, and Richmond to advance to the semifinals at Madison Square Garden. At MSG, they defeated UCF to advance to the NIT finals where they routed Georgia Tech to claim the 2017 NIT championship.

Preseason

Departures

Recruiting

Exhibition games in Australia
The Frogs traveled to Sydney and Melbourne, Australia, from August 5–16, 2017, and played five exhibition games under International Basketball Federation (FIBA) rules. TCU's starting sophomore guard Jaylen Fisher missed the trip due to a knee injury, and incoming freshmen Lat Mayen, an Australia native, and Kevin Samuel were unable to travel pending NCAA eligibility clearance.  All three players were expected to be healthy and cleared prior to the season opener on November 10; however, the Frogs ultimately elected to redshirt Mayen and Samuel.  The Horned Frogs defeated the Savannah Pride 108–54, Australia's Centre of Excellence 105–71, the Melbourne All-Stars 96–70, the Australia Longhorns 107–81, and the Knox Raiders 107–63.

Season projections
The Big 12 Conference coaches picked the Horned Frogs to finish third in regular season league play in the preseason coaches' poll, the highest-ever projection for the Frogs since joining the league in 2012 and being picked to finish ninth or tenth in each of their first five seasons. At Big 12 Media Day in Kansas City, Kansas head coach Bill Self suggested TCU would compete with the Jayhawks for the regular season crown. Senior Vladimir Brodziansky was one of five Big 12 players selected to the Preseason All-Big 12 team, and represents TCU's first selection since joining the league.

TCU received votes in the preseason Associated Press Poll and USA Today Coaches Poll, equivalent to 29th and 30th place, respectively.

Roster

Schedule and results

|-
!colspan=9 style=| Exhibition

|-
!colspan=9 style=| Regular season

|-
!colspan=9 style=| Big 12 Tournament

|-
!colspan=9 style=| NCAA tournament

|-

Schedule Source: GoFrogs.com

Rankings

TCU received votes in the preseason polls after their 2017 NIT Championship season. On December 25, 2017, the Horned Frogs received the program's first top-10 ranking from the Associated Press poll, surpassed the following day by a top-8 ranking from the USA Today Coaches Poll.

^Coaches Poll did not release a Week 2 poll at the same time AP did.
*AP does not release post-NCAA tournament rankings.

Future players

Signing class entering 2018-19

References

Tcu
TCU Horned Frogs men's basketball seasons
Tcu